The Lafayette Goodbar House is a historic house at 614 Walnut Street in Newton, Massachusetts.  Built in 1915 to a design by local architect Walter A. Rollins, it is Newton's finest example of Bungalow style architecture.  It is a single story stucco-clad structure, with an overhanging gable roof that has exposed rafters.  Its windows are arrayed in banks, and have small panes.  There are knee braces that give visual support to the building's many gables.

The house was listed on the National Register of Historic Places in 1990.

See also
 National Register of Historic Places listings in Newton, Massachusetts

References

Houses on the National Register of Historic Places in Newton, Massachusetts
Houses completed in 1914